The Boston College Eagles men's soccer team represents Boston College in men's soccer. The team is a member of the Atlantic Coast Conference of the National Collegiate Athletic Association, having previously competed in the Big East Conference.  The Eagles were led by coach Ed Kelly from 1988 until his retirement in 2019 .

Roster

Notable alumni

 Paul Keegan (1992–1996)
 Kenny Florian (1995–1997) 
 Chris Cleary (1998–2002)
 Casey Schmidt (1999–2002)
 Guy Melamed (2001–2005)
 Kyle Singer (2002)
 Bob Thompson (1999–2002)
 Charlie Davies (2004–2007) 
 Reuben Ayarna (2005–2008) 
 Alejandro Bedoya (2007–2008) 
 Šaćir Hot (2009–2010)
 Charlie Rugg (2009–2012) 
 Kyle Bekker (2009–2012)

Head coaches
 Gyorgy Lang (1967–1971)
 Ben Brewster (1972, 1977–1987)
 Hans Westerkamp (1973–1976)
 Ed Kelly (1988–2019)
 Bob Thompson (2019–present)

Yearly records

Championships
ACC Tournament:
 Champions (1): 2007

ACC Regular Season:
 Champions (1): 2007

Big East Tournament:
 Champions (3): 1990, 2000, 2002
 Runners-up (2): 1982, 1993

Big East Regular Season:
 Champions (2): 1995, 2002
 Runners-up (1): 1990

Awards and honors

NSCAA All-America
2008: Alejandro Bedoya, Second Team
2007: Reuben Ayarna, First Team; Alejandro Bedoya, First Team; Sherron Manswell, Second Team
2006: Charlie Davies, FW – First Team
2004: Guy Melamed, Second Team
2002: Guy Melamed, Third Team
2000: Chris Hamblin, First Team
1995: Paul Keegan, Second Team
1993: Paul Keegan, Second Team

College Soccer News All-America
2008: Alejandro Bedoya, First Team
2007: Alejandro Bedoya, First Team
2006: Charlie Davies, First Team
2004: Guy Melamed, First Team
2002: Guy Melamed, Second Team

Soccer America All-America
2007: Alejandro Bedoya, First Team; Reuben Ayarna, Second Team

Soccer America National Coach of the Year
Ed Kelly: 2002

NSCAA/Adidas Regional Coach of the Year
Ed Kelly: 2000, 2002 (New England), 2007, 2011 (South Atlantic)

ACC Coach of the Year
Ed Kelly: 2007

ACC Offensive Player of the Year
Alejandro Bedoya: 2007
Charlie Davies: 2006

ACC Tournament MVP
Sherron Manswell: 2007

ACC All-Tournament Team
Diego Medina-Mendez: 2011
Colin Murphy: 2011
Charlie Rugg: 2011
Amit Aburmad: 2010
Edvin Worley: 2009
Chris Brown: 2007, 2008
Alejandro Bedoya: 2007
Paul Gerstenberger, 2007
Sherron Manswell, 2007

All-ACC First Team
Kyle Bekker: 2011, 2012 
Charlie Rugg: 2010–2012 
Chris Brown: 2008
Alejandro Bedoya: 2007, 2008 
Reuben Ayarna: 2007
Charlie Davies: 2006

All-ACC Second Team
Stefan Sigurdarson: 2022
Chris Ager: 2011
Kyle Bekker: 2010
Justin Luthy: 2009
Karl Reddick: 2009
Chris Brown: 2007
Sherron Manswell: , 2005, 2007
Reuben Ayarna: 2006

 All-ACC Freshman Team
Aidan Farwell: 2021
Amos Shapiro-Thompson: 2019
Stefan Sigurdarson: 2019
Victor Souza: 2019
Aidan Farwell: 2021

Big East Coach of the Year
Ed Kelly: 1989, 1990, 2000, 2002

Big East Offensive Player of the Year
Guy Melamed: 2004
Casey Schmidt: 2000
Paul Keegan: 1994

Big East Goalkeeper of the Year
Kyle Singer: 2002
Chris Hamblin: 2000

Big East Tournament Most Outstanding Player
Bobby Thompson: 2000, 2002
Justin Ceccarelli: 1990

References

External links

 

 
1967 establishments in Massachusetts